Benhur L. Salimbangon (June 3, 1945 – December 24, 2020) was a Filipino politician. A member of KAMPI and the One Cebu party, Salimbangon was elected to the House of Representatives of the Philippines in 2007, representing the Fourth District of Cebu. He also served as Board Member of the Fourth District of Cebu for two terms from 1992-1998.

He died on 24 December 2020 aged 75.

References

External links
Member Information: Benhur F. Salimbangon at the House of Representatives of the Philippines

|-

People from Cebu
1945 births
2020 deaths
Kabalikat ng Malayang Pilipino politicians
Lakas–CMD politicians
One Cebu politicians
Members of the House of Representatives of the Philippines from Cebu
National Unity Party (Philippines) politicians
Deaths from cancer in the Philippines